Cercocarpus ledifolius is a North American species of mountain mahogany known by the common name curl-leaf mountain mahogany. It is widespread across much of the Western United States as well as Baja California in Mexico. It can be found at elevations ranging from  600 to 3,000 m (2,000 to 9,800 ft) elevation, with the preferred altitude varying depending on the region. It prefers shallow, well-drained soils with a sandy or grainy consistency, and is generally found in areas which receive low annual precipitation (15–26 cm). This makes it common on low mountains and slopes, where it grows in scattered groves among other drought-resistant species such as Pinyon Pines, Junipers and Sagebrush ecosystems.

Description
Cercocarpus ledifolius is a large, densely branching tree which can reach heights of 11 m (35 ft), although it is not uncommon to find the adult plant as a shrub as short as 1 m (3 ft). Its leathery, sticky, dark green leaves are up to 4 centimeters (1.6 inches) long and lance-shaped, and the edges may curl under. The flower consists of a small tan tube from which protrudes a long, plumelike style covered in luxuriant tan hairs. The flowers are arranged in inflorescences of up to 3. The fruit is a hairy achene one half to just over one centimeter (0.2-0.4 inches) long.

Age
Cercocarpus ledifolius is slow-growing, sometimes taking up to a century to reach full height. The oldest specimens are thought to be around 1,350 years old, although the primary specimen that yielded this estimate was cut down. This makes it one of the longest lived known flowering plants.

Ecology and uses
The leaves are eaten by deer year-round.

The Gosiute Native Americans used the wood to make their bows. The species has many medicinal uses for various Native American groups, such as the Paiute and Shoshone.

References

External links
 
Jepson Manual Treatment of Cercocarpus ledifolius
ledifolius.pdf United States Department of Agriculture IITF description;  Cercocarpus ledifolius
Ethnobotany, University of Michigan

ledifolius
Trees of the Western United States
Plants used in traditional Native American medicine
Plants described in 1840
Flora without expected TNC conservation status